Alan Moore's Writing for Comics is a 48-page paperback book published in 2003 by Avatar Press. The volume reprints a 1985 essay by Alan Moore on how to successfully write comics that originally appeared in the British magazine Fantasy Advertiser in four chapters, running from issue #92, August 1985, to issue #95, February 1986).

The book consists of the four chapters from the original essay along with a new essay written by Moore in 2003 reflecting on his earlier advice. The illustrations are by Jacen Burrows and the cover is by Juan Jose Ryp.

Chapters

The first four chapters are a beginner's guide about writing, storytelling and plotting a comic book script. The final chapter, however, was written in 2003; it aims to provide a writing for comics course and advises the writer "never to get stuck in one writing style, always be open to try new things". These chapters are:

Chapter 1 – The Basic Idea: Thinking About Comics: this focuses on the idea behind the whole work of art, and what the writer intends to express in his or her work.
Chapter 2 – Reaching The Reader: Structure, Pacing, Story Telling: this examines what is going on in the reader's mind and gives tips on how to keep the reader focused on the comic book.
Chapter 3 – World Building: Place and Personality: the text suggests to possible comic book writers that they examine real-life characters, people they know throughout their life, in order to create realistic fictional characters. This chapter also gives hints about how to create a detailed universe, even if it means that the writer starts by creating economic structures.
Chapter 4 – The Details: Plot and Script: this chapter aims to demolish the misunderstanding of the importance of plot. Moore delineates plot not as a list of things happening but more like a concept of time, contributing to the other elements of the art.
Final Part – Afterwords: this subsequent addition to the original essay sums up and is a confession of all the wrong things Alan Moore told the readers eighteen years earlier in the first four chapters about how they could become a good writer. Moore suggests that writers who have already started their career should "simply try new and hard things they didn't think they could manage" in order to become a better writer.

References

External links
Review at Comics Bulletin
Review at Philippine Online Chronicles

2003 non-fiction books
Avatar Press titles
Books about comics
Writing for Comics
Books about writing